Hope Lewellen (born April 20, 1967) is an American Paralympic volleyballist.

Biography
Lewellen was born in Palos Park, Illinois. In 1996 she won her first medal which was silver for her participation in wheelchair tennis at Paralympic Games, Atlanta, Georgia. Four years, in Sydney, Australia she became quarterfinalist in the same sport. In 2004, she won a bronze medal in Paralympic Games in Athens, Greece. Four years later she was awarded another bronze medal, this time for her participation in World Organization Volleyball for Disabled Intercontinental Cup in Ismaïlia, Egypt. The same year she won a silver medal in Women's Sitting Volleyball at the 2008 Summer Paralympics in Beijing, China.

References

External links

Living people
1967 births
Paralympic volleyball players of the United States
Paralympic bronze medalists for the United States
Paralympic silver medalists for the United States
Medalists at the 1996 Summer Paralympics
Medalists at the 2004 Summer Paralympics
Medalists at the 2008 Summer Paralympics
Volleyball players at the 1996 Summer Paralympics
Volleyball players at the 2004 Summer Paralympics
Volleyball players at the 2008 Summer Paralympics
Volleyball players at the 2000 Summer Paralympics
American sportswomen
American sitting volleyball players
Women's sitting volleyball players
People from Palos Park, Illinois
Paralympic medalists in wheelchair tennis
21st-century American women